Tonicella undocaerulea, commonly known as the blue lined chiton, is a species of chiton.

Size and description
The blue lined chiton has a head plate with zigzag white (may be blue when alive) concentric lines without a dark border. It commonly has bright electric blue stripes and flecks when alive. The girdle is hairless and brown to red or pink, often with yellow or white mottling.

Similar species
Tonicella lineata is very similar but has a dark border to the concentric blue lines on the anterior plate. Tonicella lokii is also similar but has radiating bands on the girdle. Mopalia spectabilis looks superficially similar due to its bright blue wavy lines on the valves, but has a hairy girdle.

Distribution and habitat
The natural range of T. undocaerulea stretches from Kodiak, Alaska to Point Conception, California. It is commonly found on rocks in low intertidal and shallow subtidal waters.

Biology
This chiton grazes on coralline algae.

References

Ischnochitonidae
Molluscs described in 1973